Amidobia is a genus of beetles belonging to the family Staphylinidae.

The species of this genus are found in Europe.

Species:
 Amidobia bacilliformis (Bernhauer, 1921) 
 Amidobia creta Pace, 1985

References

Staphylinidae
Staphylinidae genera